The Djargurd Wurrong (also spelt Djargurd Wurrung) are Aboriginal Australian people of the Western district of the State of Victoria, and traditionally occupied the territory between Mount Emu Creek and Lake Corangamite.

Language

The Djargurd Wurrung people spoke the Djargurd Wurrung dialect of the Dhauwurd Wurrung language.

Country
The classification of the Groups on this territory has been subject to controversy. The historian Ian Clark states that Tindale "failed to acknowledge the existence" of the Djargurd wurrung, while locating them in the same area. The Djagurd wurrung territory was bordered by the Wada wurrung in the north, the Dhauwurd wurrung to the west, the Girai wurrung to their south, and the Gulidjan in the east.

History
The traditional lands of the Djargurd Wurrung and Gulidjan, including the Western District Lakes, now a Ramsar site, have been used by the indigenous peoples for thousands of years. There are many archaeological sites registered that include fish traps, surface scatters, middens and burial sites.

At the time of European settlement in the 1830s and 1840s the Djargurd suffered from massacres by European settlers in the Australian frontier wars, and also from attacks by the neighbouring Wada wurrung tribe. Dispossession from their land led to starvation and their theft of sheep resulted in murderous reprisals. In 1839 one clan, the Tarnbeere gundidj, was massacred by Frederick Taylor and others in a site that came to be known as Murdering Gully.

When the Aboriginal reserve was established in 1865 at Framlingham, near Warrnambool, many of the surviving members of the Djargurd wurrung were forcibly relocated. However, a number of elders refused to abandon their traditional country and stayed eking out a meagre living on the edge of towns like Camperdown. They were assisted by people such as James Dawson, a Scotsman, who acted as guardian and supported them with his own money.

In 1883 Wombeetch Puuyuun (also known as Camperdown George) died at the age of 43 and was buried in a bog outside the bounds of Camperdown Cemetery. On Dawson's return from a trip to Scotland he was shocked at where his friend had been buried and personally reburied Wombeetch in Camperdown Cemetery. He appealed for money to raise a monument, but with little public support, primarily funded the monument himself. The  obelisk was erected as a memorial to Wombeetch Puuyuun and the Aboriginal people of the district, and has been described as still inspiring today.

Clan system
The Djargurd wurrung people had 12 clans under a matrilineal system with a descent system based on the Gabadj (black cockatoo) and Grugidj (white cockatoo) moieties. The clans intermarried with Gulidjan, Girai wurring, Djab wurrung and Wada wurrung peoples.
The twelve clans are as follows:-

Notes

Citations

Sources

Aboriginal peoples of Victoria (Australia)
History of Victoria (Australia)